Henges are neolithic earthworks.

Henge may also refer to:

Arts and culture
 Henge (film), 2012 Japanese horror film
 henge (変化, へんげ), a Japanese folklore monster, a form of Yōkai 
 Henge (band), a British band
 Henge, a work of Scottish artist David Harding

Other uses
 Fredrik Henge (born 1974), Swedish golfer
 "The Henge", a WWII structure in Poland linked to Die Glocke urban myth

See also

 
 
 ringfort
 stone circle
 circular ditch
 circular rampart
 Stonehenge, England, UK
 Woodhenge, England, UK
 Carhenge, Nebraska, USA
 
 Hedge (disambiguation)
 Henshin (disambiguation), including 変身, へんしん (transformation, metamorphosis)